Wellington Council is a local government area in New South Wales, Australia

Wellington Council may also refer to:

Shire of Wellington - the local government area in Victoria, Australia
Wellington City Council - the territorial authority in New Zealand 
Wellington Council (Texas) - the defunct Boy Scout Council in Texas

See also

Wellington, New South Wales - the regional town and seat of Wellington Council
Wellington (disambiguation)